Mibladen is a commune in Midelt Province of the Drâa-Tafilalet administrative region of Morocco. At the time of the 2004 census, the commune had a total population of 3087 people living in 573 households.

References

Populated places in Midelt Province
Rural communes of Drâa-Tafilalet